was a Rinzai Zen Master born in modern-day Kanagawa Prefecture who had trained with Sōtō and Rinzai Zen-masters. Bassui was unhappy with the state of Zen practice in Japan during his time, so he set out in life with the mission of revitalizing it. The problems he saw were really two sides of the same coin. That is, he saw both too much attachment by some monks and masters to ritual and dogma as well as too much attachment by some monks and masters to freedom and informality.

Biography

Birth and early childhood
Bassui was born in 1327 in Sagami (today's Kanagawa Prefecture) during a time when Japan sat on the heels of civil war. These were the ruling years of Emperor Go-Daigo, who had begun reclaiming control of the country back from the Hōjō clan of the Kamakura shogunate. When Bassui was an infant, he was abandoned by his mother and left alone in a field. His mother had a dream during her pregnancy in which she had a premonition that her baby would be born a demon. A servant of the family retrieved the infant and raised him. Note that it is plausible his mother left him there knowing the servant would come to get him, making the ritual of abandoning the newborn a formality in which evil spirits were dispelled.

Start of religious quest
At the age of seven his father died, and Bassui became tormented by questions like "What is a soul?" and "Who is this that hears, sees and understands?" These are questions he would struggle with for a good portion of his life. He would pursue this style of inquiry in meditation, one day realizing that the soul is ungraspable due to its inherent emptiness.

When Bassui was twenty he undertook training at Jifukuji Temple under a Zen Master Oko. Bassui resisted ordaining as a monk just yet, and waited for another nine years before becoming one. Once a monk he would not wear a monk's robes or recite the sutras as everyone was doing. Instead, he was most interested in meditation and practiced it in such a devout way that it could almost appear to border on compulsive asceticism.

Bassui related the bodhisattvas of Mahayana Buddhism to names for the nature of the mind:

Tokukei
At the end of his stay at Jifukuji, Bassui sought to find the hermit monk Tokukei Jisha whom he heard lived amongst the mountains. Upon first meeting each other Tokukei appeared taken aback by Bassui's appearance (a shaved head yet regular clothing). Tokukei asked Bassui why he was not wearing his robes, to which Bassui explained he had no need for them. Bassui then expressed the true purpose of his quest, about his desire to attain enlightenment for the benefit of others. This endeared Bassui to Tokukei, and the two developed a strong friendship following this initial encounter.

Bassui's last years
Bassui left for a hermitage in Kii province but was sidetracked at Eigenji temple, where he met the Zen master/haiku poet Jakushitsu Genkō. For many years after this Bassui lived in many hermitages all over Japan, where his reputation as a clear teacher spread by word of mouth.

In 1378 Bassui settled for a bit in Kai province, but by now the audience coming to see him was growing so fast that it became hard to continue living his life as a hermit. So Bassui moved to Enzan, where he founded a temple called Kogakuan at which he lived and taught for the remainder of his life. Bassui never did like referring to Kogakuan as a temple or monastery, however, and would often just refer to it as a hermitage.

In 1387 (at the age of 61), as Bassui was sitting in zazen meditation among his followers, he turned to them and shouted twice:

He then died.

See also

Buddhism in Japan
List of Rinzai Buddhists
Hakuin Ekaku
Matsuo Bashō
Ryōkan

References

Sources

 

 

Zen Buddhist monks
Rinzai Buddhists
Japanese Zen Buddhists
1327 births
1387 deaths
People from Kanagawa Prefecture